Stuart Paul Anderson (born 17 July 1976) is a British Conservative Party politician who has been the member of parliament (MP) for Wolverhampton South West since the 2019 general election. He has been the assistant government whip since July 2022.

Early life 
When he was eight his father, Samuel, died from a brain tumour that was triggered by skin cancer blamed on his time spent in the sun deployed overseas. Samuel was a corporal in the Special Air Service Regiment (22 SAS) for 12 years, going on tours to Northern Ireland, Borneo and Oman before he returned to the UK and met Stuart's mother, Leslie, who was an army nurse. His father is buried at the SAS graveyard at St Martin's Church in Hereford.

Military service 
Anderson joined the army after leaving school at 16, and was shot in the foot by a friend during a training exercise when he was 17. Subsequent tours of duty included Northern Ireland in Operation Banner, Bosnia and Kosovo. At one point, Anderson attempted the SAS selection, but was not successful. He was in the army for nine years.

Business career 
After leaving the army at the age of 25, Anderson worked in close protection for high-profile clients in the UK, Africa and the Middle East, including the Qatari prime minister Abdullah bin Khalifa Al Thani. He worked in over 50 countries and ran security for US federal government officials in Baghdad during the 2003 invasion of Iraq.

Anubis Associates 
In 2005, Anderson co-founded Anubis Associates in Herefordshire. The company offered courses in close protection training, "operational protection" for corporate VIPs and "discreet personal protection" and consultancy services for petrochemical groups, financial institutions and stadiums. For six years during the War on Terror, Anubis had "quite a sensitive" government contract to provide Five Eyes training.

Anubis Associates collapsed in 2012, which Anderson attributes to the end of the War on Terror. He describes himself as having gone from a "paper millionaire" to being in receipt of food parcels within a month. At the time of its collapse, Anubis Associates owed £271,000 in unpaid tax. Administrators noted that Anderson, a director and major shareholder, had received £54,000 in illegal dividends "based on forecasted profits for a future period" that never materialised. Ordered to repay the money in full, Anderson only offered £2,000, arguing that he might otherwise go personally bankrupt. Anderson said that he lost his house and ended up needing to use a food bank as a result, stating, "It was painful, but I have never hid away from what happened and have spoken many times about it."

eTravelSafety 
Within a week of the collapse of his previous company, Anderson founded another based on personal security, eTravelSafety, of which he was "currently operating as CEO" at the time of the 2019 United Kingdom general election, according to his LinkedIn page. In December 2019 Private Eye reported that despite Anderson's professed enthusiasm for Brexit, his company had received £500,000 from the Midlands Engine Investment Fund, a government fund which receives its financial backing from the European Union, with £79 million coming from the European Development Fund and £123 million from the European Investment Bank. The article also noted that whatever the next government decided should happen to EU-funded programmes such as the Midlands Engine Investment Fund, eTravelSafety was now guaranteed its share of EU money.

According to Anderson's entry in the Register of Members' Financial Interests, on 27 February 2020, his shareholding in eTravelSafety was not more than 15% and, on 18 May 2020, his shareholdings were no longer valued at more than £70,000.

Political career 
Anderson has said that he had no knowledge or interest in politics during his military career. For example, at the time he went to Northern Ireland, he says that he had no knowledge of the background of The Troubles. He first developed an interest in a political career around 2005, but did not act on it for another nine years, when, after discussing it with his wife, he bought a book called Politics For Dummies and googled "how to become an MP". He voted for the Conservative Party in 2015, because in Hereford "you don't vote for Labour" and said there was no one else running. In fact, several other party candidates stood in Hereford and South Herefordshire at the 2015 general election. Anderson says that he did not know anything else about the political parties. He joined the Conservative Party in 2016. He had previously ridiculed party activists, but found that although he did not always have the depth of knowledge required, he enjoyed speaking to voters on the doorstep.

Herefordshire Council 
Anderson was elected to Herefordshire Council at a by-election in October 2017, although he failed to attend almost half of his first 13 scheduled council meetings. He did not stand for re-election in May 2019.

House of Commons 
Anderson was selected as the Conservative Party's prospective parliamentary candidate for Wolverhampton South West in December 2018 and, after moving there, he contested the 2019 general election as its candidate. He won the seat by 1,661 votes. Following the election, he was named by The Guardian as one of the seven "most controversial" new Conservative MPs, due to his receipt of an illegal dividend as a director of a now defunct company.

In January 2020, The Independent reported that Anderson appeared to have edited his own Wikipedia article (with an account named "Stuart Anderson MP") to remove information about the unlawful payments he had accepted, and made a minor correction about the directorship of one of his companies. Anderson is a member of the Defence Select Committee.

In October 2020, Anderson voted against an opposition day motion calling on the government to continue funding free school meals for 1.4 million disadvantaged children over the school holidays until Easter 2021 during the COVID-19 pandemic. Labour accused the Conservatives of voting to let children go hungry; Anderson said he opposed the motion, as he believed it was "the role of the wider welfare system to help families that require extra support" outside school term. He said that the government had temporarily increased Universal Credit by £20 a week until April 2021, although he abstained on a later opposition day motion calling on the government to stop the planned cut in Universal Credit and Working Tax Credit in April. Following the vote, empty plates were left outside his constituency office in protest. Anderson said that he had received death threats following the vote, saying, "I've been told to watch myself if I turn up anywhere. Other MPs have had a lot worse than me and some are afraid to go outside their house at the moment." The following month, the government U-turned on the policy, which Anderson welcomed.

During Partygate, Anderson was supportive of the prime minister, Boris Johnson, saying, "As a soldier I understand supporting people not just when they're going through good times but when they're going through bad times. The prime minister has been loyal to me and I am loyal to him." After further images of the prime minister drinking during the second lockdown were reported in the media, Anderson and Dudley North MP Marco Longhi said that the country had "moved on" from the scandal and accused sections of the media of trying to oust the prime minister for his role in delivering Brexit. Anderson later reiterated his support for Johnson's premiership during the Chris Pincher scandal.

Anderson was made an assistant government whip in July 2022.

Expenses claims 
Following the 2009 parliamentary expenses scandal, MPs have been under more scrutiny for their expenses claims. Expenses claims by Anderson notable enough to have attracted media comment include £60.42 on Grammarly software, and £4,108 for accommodation, including rent, constituency home Council Tax, gas and electricity for his constituency home, and staying in a London hotel to attend Parliament. He has also claimed £4,059 on Punjabi lessons. His constituency has a large Indian community.

Anderson claimed £3,598 for utilities in 2021, more than any other MP.

Political positions 
During the 2019 general election campaign, Anderson repeatedly pledged his support for Johnson's Brexit withdrawal agreement and said he would support a no-deal Brexit if Johnson's Withdrawal Agreement Bill were not passed.

Anderson has hardly ever rebelled against his party, with two exceptions to date: a free vote on a bill seeking to ban demonstrations outside abortion clinics (in which 56 Conservative MPs voted for the bill and 43 against), and a vote on the Abortion (Northern Ireland) Regulations 2021 (in which 223 Conservative MPs voted in favour and 79 voted against, Anderson among them).

Anderson cites Winston Churchill, Margaret Thatcher and the Labour prime minister Clement Attlee as his political inspirations.

Personal life 
Anderson is married and has five children.

In his maiden speech, Anderson spoke about his experience of suicidal ideation and alcoholism following his military career, and how it led to him finding religion. Anderson is a member of the controversial evangelical Freedom Church, and his former business eTravelSafety shares the same registered business address as Freedom Church Hereford.

References

External links 

 

1976 births
Living people
Conservative Party (UK) MPs for English constituencies
UK MPs 2019–present
Councillors in Herefordshire
Royal Green Jackets soldiers